The 2003–2004 Liga Alef season saw Maccabi Hadera (champions of the North Division) and Maccabi Be'er Sheva (champions of the South Division) winning the title and promotion to 2004–05. However as Maccabi Hadera folded during the following summer, eventually second placed Maccabi Tirat HaCarmel was promoted instead. During the summer Maccabi Kiryat Gat was demoted to Liga Alef, and Maccabi HaShikma Ramat Hen was promoted to Liga Artzit as well.

At the bottom, following a series of reprieves, caused by Maccabi Hadera and Hapoel Bat Yam folding and Maccabi Kiryat Gat being demoted to Liga Alef, only one club, Hapoel Migdal HaEmek was automatically relegated to Liga Bet.

North Division

South Division

References
Liga Alef 03/04, walla.co.il

Liga Alef seasons
4
Israel